Kalyan Mal Lodha is an educationist, Hindi writer, literary critic and social reformer who served as vice-chancellor of Jodhpur University.

Lodha was born in Jodhpur, Rajasthan, and now lives in Kolkata. He has contributed significantly to the cause of Jain religion and Jain community. He was Head of the Department of Hindi at Calcutta University.

Lodha was presented with the Bihari Award by K. K. Birla Foundation at Kolkata for his book titled Vagdwar. It comprises a thorough study of the productions of eight prominent Hindi poets, Tulsi, Soordas, Kabir, Nirala, Maithili Sharan Gupta, Jai Shankar Prasad, Mahadevi Verma and Makhanlal Chaturvedi.

References 

Year of birth missing (living people)
Living people
People from Jodhpur
Heads of universities and colleges in India
Academic staff of the University of Calcutta
Indian social reformers